Austevoll is a municipality and an archipelago in Vestland county, Norway. It is located in the traditional district of Midthordland in Western Norway. The administrative centre is the village of Storebø on the island of Huftarøy. Other villages include Årland, Austevollshella, Bakkasund, Bekkjarvik, Birkeland, Haukanes, Husavik, Kolbeinsvik, Otterå, Våge, and Vinnes.

The municipality consists of hundreds of islands located southwest of the city of Bergen. The municipality is considered to be among the ports in the world with the largest ocean-going fishing trawler fleet. Since the 1980s, the offshore oil industry and fish farming industry have both grown to be important industries in Austevoll.

The  municipality is the 323rd largest by area out of the 356 municipalities in Norway. Austevoll is the 175th most populous municipality in Norway with a population of 5,283.

General information

The municipality of Austevoll was established on 1 January 1886 when it was separated from the municipality of Sund. The initial population for the new municipality of Austevoll was 2,396. During the 1960s, there were many municipal mergers across Norway due to the work of the Schei Committee. On 1 January 1964, the southern part of the islands of Selbjørn and Huftarøy (population: 696) was transferred from Fitjar Municipality to Austevoll. This put the whole Austevoll archipelago in the municipality of Austevoll.

Name
The municipality is named after the old Austevoll farm, since this was the old site of the Austevoll Church. The farm is now part of the village of Austevollshella. The first element is austr which means "east" and the last element is vǫllr which means "meadow". The municipality has changed the spelling of its name three times. Before 1889 the name was written "Østevold" or "Østervold". From 1889 to 1917, it was spelled "Austevold", and since 1918 it has been spelled "Austevoll".

Coat of arms
The coat of arms were granted on 30 November 1984. The arms are blue with four silver-colored fish swimming up to the left. The shoal of herring was chosen for the arms since herring fishing is a very important part of the local economy.

Churches
The Church of Norway has one parish within the municipality of Austevoll. It is part of the Fana prosti (deanery) in the Diocese of Bjørgvin.

Geography

Austevoll consists of 667 islands off the west coast of Western Norway. It lies south of the Korsfjorden, west of the Bjørnafjorden, and north of the Selbjørnsfjorden. The Marstein Lighthouse lies in the northwestern part of the municipality.

Largest islands
Huftarøy
Selbjørn
Hundvåko
Stolmen
Storekalsøy
Møkster

Neighbours
The island municipality shares water borders with the municipality of Øygarden to the north, Bergen and Bjørnafjorden municipalities to the northeast, Tysnes municipality to the east, and Fitjar and Bømlo municipalities to the south. The North Sea lies to the west of Austevoll.

Demographics
{{Historical populations
|footnote = Source: Statistics Norway.Per 1 January 1964, a part of 1222 Fitjar (696 persons) and 1244 Austevoll were merged to one municipality, 1244 Austvoll.
|shading = off
|1855|2057
|1865|2260
|1875|2396
|1890|2332
|1900|2434
|1910|2459
|1920|2760
|1930|2928
|1946|3272
|1951|3231
|1961|3366
|1971|3854
|1981|3912
|1991|4148
|2001|4446
|2011|4680
|2019|5212
}}

Of the 667 islands, only eight are populated year-round. About 29% of the inhabitants live in densely populated areas. About 28% of the inhabitants are under the age of 17, which is 4.4% over the national average. About 4.7% of the inhabitants are 80 years or older.

Villages

Inhabited islands

Gallery

Industry
Fishing is the most important industry in Austevoll, as it has been for centuries. Traditionally, fishing has taken place in coastal areas, not far off shore. After decades of overfishing, the herring disappeared in the 1950s. This forced a restructuring of the fishing fleet. Since the 1960s, the shipping companies built bigger ships, and went further out into the seas, and they began fishing for other fish species, not just herring. The overfishing of herring also forced better research on fishing, resulting in the Norwegian Institute of Marine Research. Austevoll is the home of the Austevoll Aquaculture Research Station.

Since the early 1980s, the offshore supply industry has emerged in the wake of the offshore Norwegian oil industry. The offshore shipping company DOF, which is listed on the Oslo Stock Exchange, has its headquarters at Storebø.

Education
There are five primary schools and one middle school in Austevoll, all run by the municipality. There is also one secondary school, teaching mainly fishing and nautical subjects. This is operated by the Hordaland County Municipality.

Transportation
Austevoll has car ferry connections from Hufthammar on the north tip of Huftarøy to Krokeide in Bergen, and from Husavik on the south tip of Huftarøy to Sandvikvåg in Fitjar. The municipality is also connected by express boats to Bergen in the north, and Stord, Haugesund, and Stavanger in the south. All express boat routes are operated by Norled, and ferry routes are operated by Fosen Namsos.

The islands of Huftarøy and Selbjørn, Selbjørn and Stolmen, and Hundvåkøy and Storekalsøy are connected with bridges. A fourth bridge, connecting Huftarøy and Hundvåkøy, was opened on 17 November 2007. This bridge, which in fact consists of two bridges and two stone fillings, bears the name "Austevollsbrua".

Government
All municipalities in Norway, including Austevoll, are responsible for primary education (through 10th grade), outpatient health services, senior citizen services, unemployment and other social services, zoning, economic development, and municipal roads. The municipality is governed by a municipal council of elected representatives, which in turn elect a mayor. The municipality falls under the Hordaland District Court and the Gulating Court of Appeal.

Municipal council
The municipal council of Austevoll is made up of 21 representatives that are elected to four year terms.

From 1995 to 1999 the Socialist Left Party held one seat. In the 1999–2003 election period an all-party female electoral list held one seat in the council. In the 2003-2007 election period The Liberal Party was represented in the municipal council and held one seat.

From 2011 to 2015, a coalition of the Progress Party and Center Party held power in the council. The coalition also consisted of the Christian Democratic Party before 2011. In 2011, the coalition won 12 of the 21 seats in the municipal council and had an electoral and political cooperation. The Conservative Party, Labour Party, and Christian Democratic Party make up the opposition.

The party breakdown of the council is as follows:

Mayor
The following is a list of mayors of Austevoll:

Notable residents

 Abelone Møgster, (Norwegian Wiki) (1883 in Austevoll – 1975) merchant and Norwegian resistance fighter 
 Magnus Stangeland (born 1941 in Austevoll) politician, mayor of Austevoll and entrepreneur
 Knut Fagerbakke (born 1952) a Norwegian politician, Deputy Mayor of Trondheim
 Ole Rasmus Møgster (1958 – 2010) a Norwegian businessperson with Austevoll Seafood
 Jan Bertin Østervold, (Norwegian Wiki) (born 1966 in Skien) known as Jan Thomas'', stylist and actor
 Claus Lundekvam (born 1973) former footballer with 410 club caps and 40 for Norway
 Helge André Njåstad (born 1980) a Norwegian politician, Mayor of Austevoll 2003 to 2013

1920 Summer Olympics sailors 
 Ole Olsen Østervold (1872–1936)
 Halvor Olai Møgster (1875–1950) 
 Jan Olsen Østervold (1876–1945) 
 Henrik Østervold (1878 in Austevoll – 1957) 
 Kristian Olsen Østervold (1885–1960) 
 Rasmus Ingvald Birkeland (1888–1972)
 Halvor Olai Birkeland (1894–1971)

References

External links

Municipal fact sheet from Statistics Norway 
 The gavl-boat "Notmann" sailing under the Selbjørn bridge
 3-mountain hike in Austevoll in 10 minutes
 Kayaking in Austevoll
 Diving in Austevoll
AustevollGuide – TourInfo – http://www.austevollguide.no

 
Municipalities of Vestland
1886 establishments in Norway
Fishing communities in Norway